Nappa Merrie Station, most commonly known as Nappa Merrie, is a pastoral lease that operates as a cattle station in central west Queensland, Australia.

Description
It has double frontage to Coopers Creek and is bounded to the west by the South Australian border.

It is currently owned by Morella Agriculture (David Coulton) and is managed by Peter Degoumois.

History
The traditional owners of the area are the Wongkumara people. The name comes from the words ngappa meaning water and merri meaning sandhill.

The property doesn't have a huge number of channels through the area but is part of a natural floodplain and contains low lying swamps that provide excellent feed after floodouts that last until the dry season. The homestead has been built above and adjacent to the Nappa Merrie waterhole.

The station was one of the first established along Cooper Creek, taken up in 1871 by John Conrick. Conrick and five companions, all under the age of 21, overlanded a herd of about 1,000 cattle to the property from Warrnambool to stock the station. The Conrick family later took up the Chasleton lease and remained on the station for the next 83 years. From 1892 to 1934 the property was running mostly sheep with only a few cattle. Remnants of fences and an old wool scour can still be found on the property. At one point a flock of 46,000 head of sheep were grazing on the property resulting in the land collapsing and the station being vacated for a time. In the late 1940s the Tancred brothers invested in the company with Harry Tancred later appointed as the chairman of directors. Shortly afterwards the Lake Pure lease was acquired. Cattle grazing, which had been confined to the channels and wetlands, was expanded after bores were sunk in the plains away from the channel country allowing stock to roam further.
 
The entire area was struck by drought in 1946 with many cattle dying and properties destocking.

Airmail delivery to remote properties in outback South Australia, New South Wales and Queensland commenced in 1949. Nappa Merrie along with other remote properties including Mungerannie, Clifton Hills, Glengyle, Davenport Downs, Morney Plains, Mount Leonard, Durrie, Mulka, Tanbar, Durham Downs, Cordillo Downs, Lake Pure and Naryilco were also on the route.

The Cooper Creek broke its banks in 1950 resulting in widespread flooding through the area.

Peter "Whip" Degoumious became the manager of Nappa Merrie in 2004 when it was still owned by the Stanbroke Pastoral Company. S. Kidman & Co. took up the lease in 2007 for a seven-year period.

Bushfires swept through the area in late 2011 burning a large portion of the station resulting in the loss of feed for stock.

In November 2016, the property was purchased by Morella Agriculture.

Dig Tree
Approximately 30,000-35,000 people enter Nappa Merrie every year to visit the heritage-listed Burke and Wills Dig Tree, situated on a small reserve held in the name of the Royal Historical Society of Queensland.

See also
List of ranches and stations
List of the largest stations in Australia

References

Stations (Australian agriculture)
Pastoral leases in Queensland
South West Queensland
1871 establishments in Australia